Abdul Jalil Mastan is an Indian politician and the former minister of Registration, Excise and Prohibition in Fifth Nitish Kumar ministry after 2015 Bihar Legislative Assembly election as a member of Indian National Congress party.  Abdul Jalil Mastan is a one of the senior leader of Indian National Congress who was elected six times since 1985 to the Bihar Legislative Assembly from Amour Assembly constituency. He has strong hold in Kosi-Seemanchal  region of Bihar. In 2020 Bihar Legislative Assembly election Mr. Jalil defeated by State President of AIMIM Bihar Mr. Akhtarul Iman.

References 

Living people
Year of birth missing (living people)
Bihar MLAs 1985–1990
Bihar MLAs 1990–1995
Bihar MLAs 2000–2005
Bihar MLAs 2005–2010
Bihar MLAs 2015–2020
People from Purnia district
Indian National Congress politicians from Bihar